The Liberal Democratic Party of the Soviet Union (LDPSU) was a political party in the Soviet Union which preceded the modern-day Liberal Democratic Party of Russia (LDPR).

History 
An effectively multi-party system emerged in Soviet Union in the late 1980s in wake of the Gorbachev reforms. In March 1990, Article 6 of the Soviet Constitution, which ensured the Communist Party of the Soviet Union (CPSU) a monopoly on power, was amended to allow other political parties to hold public office. This gave room to the rise of other political parties, specifically the LDPSU. In April 1991, the LDPSU became the second officially registered party in the country.

Former KGB General Philipp Bobkov has stated that "in line with Zubatov's ideas," the Central Committee of the Communist Party of the Soviet Union "proposed creating a pseudo-party controlled by the KGB" to direct the interests and sentiments of certain social groups, however he said that he was against the idea. Former Politburo member Alexander Yakovlev described how KGB director Vladimir Kryuchkov proposed the creation of the party with Soviet leader Mikhail Gorbachev at a meeting. He also stated that the Central Committee took over which led to the creation of the Liberal Democratic Party. Yakovlev called the creation of the party a joint effort of the Central Committee and the KGB.

The outspoken leader of LDPSU Vladimir Zhirinovsky gained 8% of votes during the 1991 presidential elections. He also supported the August 1991 coup attempt.

Following the dissolution of the Soviet Union, the Russian section of the LDPSU became the Liberal Democratic Party of Russia (LDPR), while the Belarusian section became the Liberal Democratic Party of Belarus (LDPB).

See also 
 Liberal Democratic Party of Belarus
 Liberal Democratic Party of Pridnestrovie
 Liberal Democratic Party of Russia
 Liberal Democratic Party of Ukraine

References

External link

1989 establishments in the Soviet Union
1991 disestablishments in the Soviet Union
Defunct nationalist parties in Russia
Liberal Democratic Party of Russia
Political parties disestablished in 1991
Political parties established in 1989
Political parties in the Soviet Union
Russian nationalist parties
Right-wing populist parties